Na'ilah Suad Nasir is an educational researcher and the sixth president of the Spencer Foundation. She was president of the American Educational Research Association in 2021-22. Previously she held several named professorships, including the Birgeneau Chair in Educational Disparities and the  H. Michael and Jeanne Williams Chair of African-American Studies at UC Berkeley, where she also served as the vice-chancellor of equity and inclusion. She has also taught as a faculty member at the Stanford Graduate School of Education.

Education and Career 
Nasir earned her bachelor's degree from the University of California, Berkeley and PhD in Educational Psychology from the University of California, Los Angeles. Her academic career has focused on socio-cultural perspectives on education and advancing equitable school systems. Nasir's work has resulted in the publication of over 30 scholarly articles.

Honors and awards 
In 2017, she was elected a member of the National Academy of Education. In 2022, she gave the convocation speech to the Northwestern School of Education and Social Policy.

References 

University of California, Berkeley alumni
University of California, Berkeley faculty

Year of birth missing (living people)
Living people